Sejal Kumar is an Indian YouTuber and video blogger. She started her YouTube channel in February 2014, and as of February 2021, she has more than one million subscribers and over 199 million views. She recently released her first original song Aisi Hun in the project Creators for Change.

Early life and education
On 1 January 1995, Sejal Kumar was born to Anjali Kumar, a gynecologist and Anil Kumar, a retired army major. She has an elder brother named Rohan Kumar who is pursuing his studies abroad in New York, USA. She has participated in Miss India, mentioned once in a YouTube video with Komal Pandey 

Sejal Kumar did her schooling from The Mother's International school, New Delhi. After which she pursued a bachelor's degree in Economics from Shri Ram College of Commerce, Delhi University.

Career
While on her first internship trip to Turkey, Kumar uploaded her first video called "summer style turkey". Since then she has created more than 500 videos on her channel and gained 1M+ subscribers on her YouTube Channel. She has 870K+ followers on her Instagram. Sometimes her family and friends appear along with her in some of her videos. Her videos are usually centered around fashion, skits, singing and vlogs. In 2017 she vlogged her Europe tour in her "Indian girl backpacking in Europe" series. She gave a TEDx talk on "How to make YouTube a career ?" at Manipal University, Jaipur.
She has also collaborated with Fashion influencer Komal Pandey in her YouTube videos. 
Kumar also starred in The Timeliners web series Engineering Girls in 2018. In November 2018, she finally fulfilled her dream of having her own clothing line and launched her own clothing collection in collaboration with StalkBuyLove.

Awards and recognition
Kumar won the Best Vlog Award 2018 in the Cosmopolitan India Blogger Awards 2018
Kumar won the Best Lifestyle Blogger in Cosmopolitan India Blogger Awards 2019.
Kumar was presented with the Best Youth Influencer Award by Women of Steel Summit and Awards
Kumar won the Fashion Account of the year 2018 Award by Instagram.
Kumar won the Exhibit Magazine Award of Top 5000 Influencers 2019
Kumar won the Instagrammer of the Year for Fashion, 2019

References

1995 births
Place of birth missing (living people)
Living people
Indian YouTubers
YouTube channels launched in 2012